Frank Gerbode may refer to:

Frank Gerbode (surgeon) (1907–1984), American cardiovascular surgeon
Frank A. Gerbode, psychiatrist and author